Daniel 'Dani' Marín Vázquez (born 1 August 1974) is a Spanish retired footballer who played as a left back.

Club career
Marín was born in Barcelona, Catalonia. Having started with RCD Mallorca's reserves in 1993, he spent most of his 18-year professional career with local club UE Lleida (seven seasons), amassing Segunda División totals of 162 games and five goals in representation of five teams.

At the end of the 2010–11 campaign, Lleida folded and the 37-year-old Marín retired from football.

Honours
Mallorca B
Tercera División: 1994–95

Lleida
Segunda División B: 2003–04

References

External links

1974 births
Living people
Spanish footballers
Footballers from Barcelona
Association football defenders
Segunda División players
Segunda División B players
Tercera División players
CF Damm players
RCD Mallorca B players
RCD Mallorca players
Atlético Madrid B players
Elche CF players
UDA Gramenet footballers
Getafe CF footballers
Gimnàstic de Tarragona footballers
UE Lleida players
Terrassa FC footballers